Parawada is a mandal in Anakapalli district in the state of Andhra Pradesh in India.

Geography
Paravada was assembly constituency until 2009. It has an average elevation of 19 meters (65 feet).

Members of Legislative Assembly
1951 - Mullapadi Veerabhadram
1955 - Eti Nagayya
1962 - Salapu China Appala Naidu 
1967 - S.R.S.Appala Naidu 
1972 - Bhattam Srirama Murthy , Indian National Congress
1978 - Bhattam Srirama Murthy , Indian National Congress
1983 - Paila Appala Naidu, Telugu Desam Party
1985 - Paila Appala Naidu, Telugu Desam Party
1989 - Bandaru Satyanarayana Murthy, Telugu Desam Party
1994 - Bandaru Satyanarayana Murthy, Telugu Desam Party
1999 - Bandaru Satyanarayana Murthy, Telugu Desam Party
2004 - Gandi Babji, Indian National Congress

Transport
APSRTC routes

References

External links

Neighbourhoods in Visakhapatnam
Mandals in Anakapalli district